Alexander Lean (21 May 1824 – 20 November 1893) was a New Zealand runholder, architect, military volunteer and musician. He was born in London, England on 21 May 1824. His most valuable contribution as an architect were the Christchurch Supreme Court buildings, which were progressively demolished between 1974 and 1985.

In 1853, Lean was the original purchaser of land at the bottom of Rapaki Track next to the Heathcote River, which he called Riverlaw. He sold this land in 1859 to Michael le Fleming and with an additional intermittent owner, the property was purchased by Hugh Murray-Aynsley in 1862.

Lean acted as the returning officer for the Christchurch electorate in the  when he suddenly died on 20 November 1893 in Christchurch. He is buried at St Peter's in Upper Riccarton.

References

1824 births
1893 deaths
New Zealand farmers
New Zealand musicians
New Zealand military personnel
Architects from London
People from Christchurch
English emigrants to New Zealand
Burials at St Peter's Church Cemetery, Upper Riccarton
19th-century New Zealand architects